San Joaquin may refer to:

Places

Central America
San Joaquin, Corozal, a village in Belize
San Joaquín de Flores, a town in Costa Rica

North America

California, United States
The San Joaquin River
The San Joaquin Valley, the southern part of the central valley of California and the valley of the river
San Joaquin County, California, named for the river
San Joaquin, California, a town in Fresno County, named for the river
San Joaquin City, California, in San Joaquin County, a former port on the river
Rancho San Joaquin, a Mexican land grant in Orange County
San Joaquin Hills, in Orange County, named for the rancho

Mexico
San Joaquín Municipality, Querétaro, a town
San Joaquín metro station (Mexico City)

South America
San Joaquín, Bolivia, a town
San Joaquín, Chile, part of the Greater Santiago Metropolitan Region
San Joaquín metro station (Santiago)
San Joaquín, Ecuador, a town
San Joaquín, Carabobo, a city in Venezuela

Other places
San Joaquin (Equatorial Guinea), a volcano in Africa
San Joaquin, Iloilo, a municipality in the Philippines

Other uses
 Saint Joachim, the father of Mary, mother of Jesus
San Joaquin (soil), the state soil of California
San Joaquin kit fox, an endangered subspecies from Central California 	
San Joaquin (train), a passenger train service in Central California	
Episcopal Diocese of San Joaquin, a church district in Central California	
Anglican Diocese of San Joaquin, a breakaway group from that diocese

See also
Joaquín (given name)